For the Night People is an LP album by Julie London, released by Liberty Records under catalog number LRP-3478 as a monophonic recording and catalog number LST-7478 in stereo in 1966.

Track listing

 "Won't You Come Home Bill Bailey" - (Hughie Cannon) - 2:23
 "I Got It Bad (and That Ain't Good)" - (Duke Ellington, Paul Francis Webster) - 4:00
 "Saturday Night (Is the Loneliest Night of the Week)" - (Jule Styne, Sammy Cahn) - 2:41
 "God Bless the Child" - (Arthur Herzog, Jr., Billie Holiday) - 3:40  
 "Am I Blue?" - (Harry Akst, Grant Clarke) - 3:29
 "Dream" - (Johnny Mercer) - 2:33
 "Here's That Rainy Day" (Jimmy Van Heusen, Johnny Burke) - 3:10
 "When the Sun Comes Out" - (Harold Arlen, Ted Koehler) - 3:11
 "Can't Get Out of This Mood" - (Jimmy McHugh, Frank Loesser) - 3:17
 "I Hadn't Anyone Till You" - (Ray Noble) - 2:42
 "I'll Never Smile Again" (Ruth Lowe) - 2:42

References

Liberty Records albums
1966 albums
Julie London albums